Haugerud is the only non-underground station on the Furuset Line of the Oslo Metro. It is located in the Alna borough, between the stations  of Tveita and Trosterud. Like the area around many of the other stations on Furusetbanen, the area around Haugerud is a dense residential neighborhood with a number of tall apartment buildings.

References

External links

Oslo Metro stations in Oslo
Railway stations opened in 1970
1974 establishments in Norway